Italy team or Team Italy may refer to:

 Italy national football team
 Italy national cricket team
 Italy national rugby union team
 Italy national rugby sevens team 
 Italy national rugby league team
 Italy national basketball team
 Italy national beach soccer team
 Italy national badminton team
 Italy national futsal team
 Italy national korfball team